Omsk Aviation Technical School is a college in Omsk, Russian Federation.
Omsk Aviation Technical School, often informally referred to as OATS, is a Russian independent school located in Omsk. It educates over 2,650 budding flight enthusiasts, aged between 18 and 24 years and was founded in 1923 by Alexander Vasilyevich Belyakov.

Omsk
Education in Omsk Oblast